Batan Island is the main island of Batanes, an archipelagic province in the Philippines. It is the second largest of the Batanes Islands, the northernmost group of islands in the country. The other municipalities are Ivana, Mahatao and Uyugan.

Geography
Batan is a dumbbell-shaped volcanic island, part of the Luzon Volcanic Arc.

Events
The Japanese invasion of the Philippines began with the invasion of Batan Island by a 490-man naval combat unit and an indeterminate number of air corps troops, on two transports escorted by one destroyer and four torpedo boats.  This was the first landing on American territory, the same day as the attack on Pearl Harbor. Japanese forces quickly secured the existing small airfield outside Basco without resistance and began expansion work immediately as a forward base for operations against Luzon. However, work was discontinued only a few days later as the success of the Japanese bombing of Clark Field rendered a base at Basco redundant. On 10 December 1941, the naval combat force was withdrawn.

See also

Ivatan language
List of islands of the Philippines

References

External links

 

Islands of Batanes